The imperial election of 1790 was an imperial election held to select the emperor of the Holy Roman Empire.  It took place in Frankfurt on September 30.

Background 
Maximilian III Joseph, the elector of Bavaria, died of smallpox on December 30, 1777, leaving no immediate heirs.  He was succeeded by his distant cousin Charles Theodore, then elector of the Electoral Palatinate.  Under the provisions of the Peace of Westphalia covering a merger of family lines, the vote of the Palatinate was suppressed, and Charles Theodore, while ruling both territories, would hold one vote as elector of Bavaria.

War of the Bavarian Succession 

As Charles Theodore also had no immediate legitimate heirs, his cousin Charles II August, the duke of Zweibrücken, was entitled to inherit both Bavaria and the Palatinate.  When Charles Theodore, who preferred to live in the Palatinate, offered southern Bavaria to Joseph II, Holy Roman Emperor in exchange for part of the Austrian Netherlands, Charles August objected.  He was joined in this objection by Prussia and Saxony, both of whom were wary of any increase in Austrian power in Central Europe.  The resulting war was settled by the Treaty of Teschen of May 13, 1779, which granted the Innviertel to Austria, affirmed Charles Theodore's inheritance of the entire Bavarian electorate, and recognized some Prussian territorial claims.

Election of 1790 
Joseph died on February 20, 1790.  The electors called to Frankfurt to choose his successor were:

 Friedrich Karl Joseph von Erthal, elector of Mainz
 Clemens Wenceslaus of Saxony, elector of Trier
 Archduke Maximilian Francis of Austria, elector of Cologne
 Leopold, king of Bohemia and brother of Joseph II
 Charles Theodore, Elector of Bavaria
 Frederick Augustus I, elector of Saxony
 Frederick William II of Prussia, elector of Brandenburg
 George III of the United Kingdom, elector of Brunswick-Lüneburg

Leopold was also king of Hungary and grand duke of Tuscany.  In the latter role, he had been a reformer and constitutionalist, and his election offered the potential of the spread of similar reforms in Austria and the broader Empire.

Elected 
Leopold was elected and became emperor.

1790
1790 in the Holy Roman Empire
1790 elections
18th-century elections in Europe
Non-partisan elections
Leopold II, Holy Roman Emperor